Lata is a Sanskrit female given name.

Lata or LATA may also refer to:

Places
Lata, Solomon Islands
Lata, a village in Gulripshi District of Abkhazia
Lata Mountain, American Samoa
Lāṭa, a historical region of India

Other uses
Local access and transport area (LATA), an American telecommunications regulation
Alternative name for lokša, a type of flatbread

See also

Latha (disambiguation)
Latas (disambiguation)
Lota (name)